The Haval H5, also known as the Great Wall Haval H5 and Hover H5 for the first generation model, is a compact sport utility vehicle (SUV) from June 2010 to 2020 and Mid-size SUV from 2023 produced by the Chinese manufacturer Great Wall Motor. It uses a body-on-frame construction, with rear-wheel-drive and selectable four-wheel-drive, and is available with either gasoline or diesel engines.



First generation (2010–2020)

In Australia, it was being marketed as the X-Series, with model names relating to engine size, thus as the X240 and the X200. The vehicle has passed the European tests regarding environment protection, safety and performance and is entitled for marketing throughout the European Union. It is the successor of the Great Wall Haval H3 and both cars are nearly identical, except for their front designs.

Features
It uses Mitsubishi 4G63 and Mitsubishi 4G69S4N petrol engines of 2.0 and 2.4 litres, or the  GW2.5TCI diesel. In October 2010, the more powerful  but smaller (2.0 litres) GW4D20 diesel was added to the lineup. The Haval H5 comes with either a five-speed or a six-speed manual transmission, depending on model. It uses disk brakes. It has three trims: Standard, Luxury and Premium. The Premium trim features power windows, power door locks, rear window defrosters, leather seats, power-adjustable driver's seat, six speakers, a DVD player, GPS and a power sunroof all as standard. Heated seats are optional. Styling of the body and rear end of the Haval H5 is extremely similar to the exterior design of the Isuzu Axiom, with the front end design taking inspiration from the Mazda CX-7.

Starting from 2011, the variant sold in Australia is no longer the H3, but the facelifted H5, although the 2.4 litre gasoline model is sold as the X240 and is only available in manual transmission, and the 2.0 litre diesel models are available in either automatic or manual transmission and are sold as the X200.

Four wheel drive: The X200 automatic version (2013) does not feature a low and high range while in 4WD mode. The manual version does.

Variations

A slightly different version, with a typical large grille and called the GKC Edition was also produced, but only for the Chinese market. This version was facelifted in July 2011 and was known as the Zhizun.

Second generation (2023-)

News of the second generation Haval H5 surfaced in March 2023, showing that the second generation Haval H5 would be a midsize SUV based on the same platform as the Great Wall King Kong Cannon. The engine of the second generation Haval H5 would be a 2.0-litre turbo engine producing a maximum power of 224hp（165kW）. A 2.0-litre turbo diesel engine producing 122kW would also be offered.

References

External links

H5
Cars introduced in 2009
Cars of China
Rear-wheel-drive vehicles
All-wheel-drive vehicles
2010s cars